Spella Caffè is a coffee shop in Portland, Oregon, United States.

Description and history
Andrea Spella opened the cafe in downtown Portland in 2010, having previously operated a cart. The menu includes coffee and espresso drinks, affogato, gelato, Italian sodas, and shakeratos.

A Spella Caffe espresso bar was also available in the Italian food hall and marketplace Cooperativa, as of late 2020.

The company has an Art Deco logo.

Reception
In Willamette Week 2016 list of "Five Essential Old-School Portland Cafes", Jordan Michelman said Spella offers the city's best shakerato and wrote, "Andrea Spella's love letter to the Italian espresso tradition is still as relevant and quality-focused as ever, celebrating 10 years at his postage-stamp-sized cafe (Spella started as a cart some years before). The place is intentionally unbeholden to the whims of fashion, instead aiming for a consistent daily offering focused on its Rancilio lever espresso machine." Delia Mooney of Tasting Table included Spella in a 2017 list of Alton Brown's favorite coffee shops as part of his Eat Your Science tour. In The Oregonian 2017 list of "Downtown Portland's 10 best coffee shops", Samatha Bakall described Spella as a "perennially packed, closet-sized Italian cafe tucked into a downtown office building" and wrote, "Spella is our go-to spot for a quick espresso (sipped standing, of course) or an early afternoon affogato, where hot espresso is poured over a scoop of gelato. There's barely enough room to wait for your order, so you'll want to plan on taking your coffee to go if you've got work to do."

In Food & Wine 2019 overview of Portland's coffee scene, David Landsel wrote, "Andrea Spella's welcoming little cafe, with its well-trained baristas, holds an outsized spot in the heart of many a downtown worker. This one’s for the grownups. For grownups who, every now and then, require a delicious affogato to make it through their afternoon." In her 2021 list of "14 Distinctive Portland Cafés That Roast Their Own Coffee", Eater Portland Katrina Yentch said "Spella is a proud homage to Italian coffee making".

References

External links

 
 Spella Caffe at Zomato

Coffeehouses and cafés in Oregon
Coffee in Portland, Oregon
Restaurants in Portland, Oregon
Southwest Portland, Oregon